The Émile Bouchard Trophy is awarded annually by the Quebec Major Junior Hockey League, to the "Defenceman of the Year."

Winners

External links
 QMJHL official site List of trophy winners.

Quebec Major Junior Hockey League trophies and awards